Hagar in the Wilderness is an oil-on-canvas painting executed by the French artist Camille Corot in 1835. The painting depicts the biblical figure Hagar as she wanders through the wilderness of Beersheba. Specifically, the painting renders the moment in which Hagar and her newborn son Ishmael experience divine salvation, seen via Corot's inclusion of an angel in the back center of the painting. Much of the landscape seen in the work is derived from Corot's earlier nature studies.

Hagar is in the collection of the Metropolitan Museum of Art, in New York.

References

1835 paintings
Paintings by Jean-Baptiste-Camille Corot
Paintings in the collection of the Metropolitan Museum of Art
Hagar
Angels in art